The Local Government (Northern Ireland) Act 1972 (1972 c. 9) was an Act of the Parliament of Northern Ireland that constituted district councils to administer the twenty-six local government districts created by the Local Government (Boundaries) Act (Northern Ireland) 1971, and abolished the existing local authorities in Northern Ireland.

District councils
Each Local Government District was to have a district council consisting of elected councillors of whom one would be chairman and another could be vice-chairman.

Provision for the continuation of city and borough status was included in the Act, which provided that the charter of each county borough should apply to the new district containing it, and that the council for a district which includes the whole or the major part of a borough other than a county borough may... resolve that the charter of the corporation of the borough shall have effect in relation to the district. In addition a district council could apply for a new charter making it a borough. In the original Act, the council could petition the Governor of Northern Ireland for a royal charter. By the time the Act came into effect, however, the office of governor had been abolished, and petitions were addressed to the Secretary of State for Northern Ireland. Where a district was designated a city or borough, the chairman and vice-chairman became the mayor and deputy-mayor. In the case of Belfast, the chairman's title continued to be lord mayor.

Abolition of existing local authorities
Section 131 of the Act stated that every county and every county borough shall cease to be an administrative area for local government purposes, and that every borough (other than a county borough), every urban district and every rural district shall be abolished.

Also abolished were any joint boards established under the Public Health (Ireland) Act 1878 or Water Supplies and Sewerage Act (Northern Ireland) 1945 and the Belfast City and District Water Commissioners.

Exempted from abolition were the corporations of the county boroughs of Belfast and Londonderry, and of any municipal borough whose charter had been adopted by the new district council. In these cases the district council was to become the corporation from 1 October 1973.

The Act also provided for the dissolution of new town commissions established under the New Towns Acts (Northern Ireland) 1965 to 1968.

The composition of the new districts was as follows:

† In 1969, both Londonderry Corporation (the county borough council) and Londonderry Rural District Council were abolished. Their functions were transferred to the Londonderry Development Commission, established to provide new housing and infrastructure in and around Derry.

‡ All district councils in Fermanagh were abolished in 1968, creating a unitary county council.

§ Craigavon Urban District replaced Lurgan Rural District in 1967.

Staff commission
Section 40 of the Act established the Staff Commission of Northern Ireland to oversee the recruitment, training and terms and conditions of employment of council officers, and those of the Northern Ireland Housing Executive.

The commission was to:
Establish advisory appointment panels to advise councils on the suitability of applicants for appointment as officers
Draw up a code of conduct to ensure fair and equal consideration of all applications for employment
Monitor fair employment procedures in councils
Assess future requirements of councils for officers, and publicise the opportunities for such employment to the public.
Promote cooperation between councils
Assist development of training for local government officers
Assist with the negotiation of procedures for standard rates of remuneration, or other terms and conditions of employment

References

External links

Local Government Act (Northern Ireland) 1972 from BAILII

Acts of the Parliament of Northern Ireland 1972
Local government legislation in the United Kingdom
Districts of Northern Ireland, 1972–2015